Friedrich Schlie (12 December 1839, Brüel, Mecklenburg-Schwerin - 21 July 1902, Bad Kissingen)  was a German art historian and archaeologist.

Life
As the son of a Kantor and teacher, Schlie was taught by private tuition until his graduation examination in Rostock in 1863. He then studied philology and art history at the University of Rostock and University of Munich, graduating in 1867. Next he worked for 2 years as an auxiliary secretary at the Prussian Archaeological Institute in Rome. From 1869 he worked as a teacher at the several secondary schools in Mecklenburg before in 1877 becoming director of the Schweriner Kunstmuseum.

Friedrich Schlie received several honours, being made a Hofrat in 1882, Professor in 1891 and Geheimer Hofrat in 1899. He was a corresponding member of the Archaeological Institute in Rome and Berlin, as well as a permanent member of the committee of the international art historical congress. He also worked for the Society of Mecklenburgische History and Antiquity. In the years 1898 to 1902, he published his comprehensive five volume work "Kunst- und Geschichtsdenkmäler des Großherzogtums Mecklenburg-Schwerin" (Art and Art History of the Great-Dukedom of Mecklenburg-Schwerin"). He was also a friend and promoter of the famous archeologist Heinrich Schliemann.

A 1902 marble bust of Schlie by Ludwig Brunow is to be found in the Staatl. Museum Schwerin.

Sources
Hans-Günter Buchholz: Die Archäologenfreundschaft zwischen Heinrich Schliemann und Friedrich Schlie. Der Briefwechsel zweier bedeutender Archäologen, Mitteilungen aus dem Heinrich-Schliemann-Museum Ankershagen 3 (1995)

External links
 
 

1839 births
1902 deaths
People from Ludwigslust-Parchim
People from the Grand Duchy of Mecklenburg-Schwerin
German classical scholars
German art historians
Archaeologists from Mecklenburg-Western Pomerania
German male non-fiction writers
19th-century German male writers
19th-century German archaeologists
19th-century German historians